Chris Shelton is an author, consultant, anti-cult activist, podcaster, YouTuber and former Scientologist. He was a member of Scientology for 27 years and in the Sea Organization for 17 of those years. He left Scientology in 2012, after which he started speaking out about his experiences. In 2022 he completed an MSc in Coercive Control from the University of Salford in Manchester, England. He appeared in the documentary series Leah Remini: Scientology and the Aftermath, and in other media.

Works 

 Scientology᛬ A to Xenu: An Insider's Guide to What Scientology is Really All About (2015)

References

Living people
American former Scientologists
Critics of Scientology
Anti-cult movement
Alumni of the University of Salford
Year of birth missing (living people)